Hades (also sometimes Pluto or Hell) is a fictional character appearing in DC Comics publications and related media, commonly as an adversary and sometimes-ally of the superhero Wonder Woman. Based upon the eponymous Greek mythological figure, he is the Olympian god of the dead and ruler of the underworld.

Publication history
 Hades first appeared under his Roman name Pluto in Wonder Woman #16 published in the summer of 1946, written by Wonder Woman creator William Moulton Marston. In this story, he kidnaps women from Earth, using them to decorate his castle on the planet Pluto, before being defeated by Wonder Woman and her allies. He would next encounter Wonder Woman in a 1962 Silver Age adventure in issue #131 of her monthly title, in which the hero ventures underground into Hades (referred to in-story as "the Underworld") at the behest of her mother Queen Hippolyta, battling Cerberus along the way and cannily avoiding a skirmish with Pluto's ghostly subjects. In 1978's Adventure Comics #460, Wonder Woman once again undertakes a journey to Pluto's realm (referred to both as "the Land of the Dead" and "Hell") to retrieve Steve Trevor's soul from the god's clutches. Here Pluto is depicted with Mephistophelian features, including devil horns and scarlet skin.

Later in the Bronze Age, the character would be rechristened Hades (as part of writer Mindy Newell's move to standardize the use Greek names for DC's Olympian pantheon) in Wonder Woman's final pre-Crisis adventure in Wonder Woman #329. He would be re-introduced as a more benevolent character, again named Hades, in writer/artist George Pérez's post-Crisis reboot of the Wonder Woman mythos in 1987. Yet another version of the character would debut in 2011 as part of DC Comics’ New 52 publication event, which again revised Wonder Woman’s continuity. This incarnation, referred to primarily as Hell and sometimes as Hades, presents the character not as an adult man, but as a young boy in black and red armor, his head and face crowned with a dripping mass of melting candles.

Fictional character biography
As in classical mythology, Hades is a member of the Olympian gods, the immortal children of the Titans Cronus and Rhea. Along with his brothers Zeus and Poseidon, he ruled a significant portion of the ancient world. As the god of the Underworld, Hades had dominion over the spirits of the dead. His realm was divided into four sub-sections: Tartarus (abode of the damned), the Asphodel Fields (a misty after-world), the Elysian Fields (where the righteous dwell) and the Isle of the Blessed (the paradisal resting place of those deemed great heroes). Hades rules these realms with his niece and queen Persephone.

Pre-Crisis

Hades did not figure frequently in the adventures of Wonder Woman until the end of the first volume when Hades was tricked by the Anti-Monitor into making a pact with Ares to conquer Olympus. The plot was thwarted when Persephone (referred to in-story as Kore), inspired by the love between Wonder Woman and Steve Trevor, went to her husband to profess openly her love for him. Hades pulled out of the scheme, and Steve Trevor freed the gods while Wonder Woman engaged Ares in final combat.

Post-Crisis
 As a result of the machinations of the alien dark and demon god Darkseid, the Olympian gods were each split into separate entities for many years, existing as both their Greek and Roman variations. Hades' Roman counterpart, Pluto, ruled his own dimensional variant of the Underworld, occasionally coming into conflict with his "brother". The pantheons were eventually merged once more centuries later.

Hades shared a sometimes tense relationship with Wonder Woman's people, the Amazons of Themyscira. The Amazons had been appointed to guard an entryway to his realm, Doom's Doorway, behind which were trapped many monsters and undead abominations. Over the centuries, many Amazons lost their lives when the Doorway was occasionally breached. Despite their loss, the Amazons always attempted to show proper respect to the lord of the underworld, as one of the honored gods of their faith. They even built a large tabernacle to the god of the Dead which carried its own priestess who served a 1,000 years before being replaced by another. In time, most of the gods' followers died off or ceased to believe, leaving the Amazons an important part of Hades and the Olympians' continued existence.

Like her Amazon sisters, Wonder Woman has often had an uneasy relationship with Hades. Early in her career, she descended through Doom's Doorway, slaying most of the monsters and freeing her people from their terrible burden. On other occasions, she has journeyed to the Underworld to request a boon from its ruler or to free the soul of a slain comrade, such as the Amazon Artemis and the murdered Messenger god Hermes, which she succeeded in.

For most of his life, Hades clothed himself in a classical Greek toga and wore his black hair in ringlets. In recent years, however, many of the gods adopted modern clothing in an attempt to evolve with the times. Hades took to dressing in a dark black suit with top hat and cane, similar to that of a Victorian era Undertaker.

Recently, a shift in power occurred in the Olympian pantheon. While Athena assumed the throne of Mount Olympus from her deposed father Zeus, Hades was stabbed in the back by his nephew Ares. As a result, the former War God soon became the new ruler of the Underworld. As it was revealed that Olympian gods do not truly die, only become citizens of the underworld, Hades presence may still be evoked.

The new Olympian order of rule was again changed when the New Gods of Apokolips captured the Olympian pantheon and tampered with their memories. Hence, the current ruler of the Olympian underworld is still in question. This is further compounded by Ares' recent demise at the hands of Wonder Woman, putting the question of Olympian Underworld rulership in a greater state of confusion.

The New 52

In The New 52 rebooted DC's continuity, Hades appears to be but a child with pasty white skin, a dark suit of armor and most unusually a number of candles where the melted wax obscures most of his face above the nose. As a more modern name for himself he tells Lennox to call him "Hell". He is still the ruler of the underworld and the dead, but his realm and everything in it is now an extension of his will and essence.

Hades suffers a degree of self-hatred, as his realm (and by extension, himself) is filled with suffering. Hades has difficulty appreciating and expressing his own values, even if he tries to flatter occasionally. This includes going so far as refusing to believe it is  possible for a Lasso-ensnared Diana to be capable of loving everyone, including him.

Though Diana wishes to aid him, Hades refuses to be aided, leaving Diana to shoot him with one of the Pistols of Eros while he is looking at his own reflection, and the bullet should make him fall in love with the first person he sees.

In other media

Television
 
Hades appears in series set in the DC Animated Universe (DCAU):
 Hades appears in the Justice League two-part episode "Paradise Lost", voiced by John Rhys-Davies. This version is a former lover of Hippolyta who sports long black hair, a dark goatee, and black and silver armor. Following a failed attempt at overthrowing Zeus during the Titanomachy, Hades was sentenced to eternal torment and imprisonment in the pits of Tartarus, where he became its ruler. Additionally, he is implied to be Wonder Woman's mother, claiming to have helped sculpt her from clay.
 Hades returns in the Justice League Unlimited episode "The Balance", voiced by Bob Joles. After being overthrown by Felix Faust, Hades joins forces with Wonder Woman and Shayera Hol to reclaim his throne. Following Faust's defeat, Hades tortures him for the rest of eternity.

Film
Hades appears in Wonder Woman, voiced by Oliver Platt. This version is corpulent, overweight, and employs the spirits of the dead as personal servants.

Video games
 Hades appears in DC Universe Online voiced by Mike MacRea.
 Hades appears as a summonable character in Scribblenauts Unmasked: A DC Comics Adventure.

Miscellaneous

Hades appears in Smallville Season 11. After being imprisoned by Zeus, he became angry and resentful over not being able to see Olympus again. In the present, he strikes a deal with Felix Faust and Mister Bones, promising them immortality in exchange for freeing him.

References

Characters created by George Pérez
Comics characters introduced in 1946
Classical mythology in DC Comics
Wonder Woman characters
Fictional characters with immortality
Fictional characters with superhuman durability or invulnerability
Fictional gods
DC Comics characters with superhuman strength
DC Comics male supervillains
DC Comics superheroes
DC Comics supervillains
DC Comics deities
DC Comics demons
Fictional dictators
Fictional kings
Hades
Greek and Roman deities in fiction
Characters created by William Moulton Marston